"You Were Meant for Me" is a song written by Steve Poltz and American singer-songwriter Jewel and performed by Jewel on her first album, Pieces of You (1995). It relates the singer's incomprehension of a failed relationship and her inadequate attempts at moving on with her life.

"You Were Meant for Me" was released as the second single from Pieces of You and went on to receive a great deal of recognition. It became a hit and reached number two on the US Billboard Hot 100 for two weeks, as well as number one on the Billboard Adult Contemporary chart for a single week. In 1997, a reissue of the single containing the unreleased "Foolish Games" allowed the song to rebound to number seven on the Hot 100, eventually totaling 65 weeks in the top 100, which at the time was a record. Worldwide, "You Were Meant for Me" experienced moderate success, reaching number three in Australia, number two in Canada and number 32 in the United Kingdom.

"Foolish Games/You Were Meant for Me" ranked at number 15 on Billboards "All Time Top 100" list in 2008. When the All Time chart was retabulated for the chart's 55th anniversary in 2013, it remained in the top 20 at number 17. The song was also re-recorded for Jewel's Greatest Hits album with backing vocals from the country trio Pistol Annies.

Background
"You Were Meant for Me" was Jewel's second single to be taken from her debut album. Atlantic Records had Jewel re-record the song for a more radio-friendly version. Initially, the first version that was released was the "Juan Patino Radio Mix" (with a music video produced by Sean Penn). This version omits the first two lines of the chorus and the last four lines of the second verse, and did not gather much attention. It was later cancelled, with the video pulled from MTV and VH1. Jewel returned again into the studio to record the song for a third time, and the resulting version produced is known as the "radio version" and is featured on Greatest Hits.

The original radio version, "Juan Patino Radio Mix", only appeared on a promotional LP titled Phyllis Barnabee Finally Gets a Bra in 1996, and its only commercial release came on a Canadian various artists compilation entitled "Now! 2" that same year. The actual "radio version" was released on a commercial CD single and later on a re-release of Pieces of You.

Composition
"You Were Meant for Me" is written in the key of E minor with a moderate, swinging tempo of 114 beats per minute.  The song follows a chord progression of C–G/B–C–Em, and Jewel's vocals span from G3 to C5.

Critical reception
Steve Baltin from Cash Box picked "You Were Meant for Me" as Pick of the Week, writing that "this simple, charming pop ditty shows why Jewel’s star is rising at a meteoric rate, with no sign of slowing down." He added, "A staple of VH1 and Triple A for the past couple of months, Jewel has just landed a role in the star-studded pop version of The Wizard Of Oz. The ensuing publicity from that, coupled with the previous success of “Who Will Save Your Soul”, should break this song out in a big way. It couldn’t happen to a more deserving artist or song." Another editor, Daina Darzin complimented it as "a sweetly affecting, charming tune whose easy groove showcases her effortless, lovely voice." British magazine Music Week gave it four out of five, describing it as "[an] acoustic cross-fertilisation of Tori Amos and Alanis Morissette."

Music video
A music video was directed by Lawrence Carroll for the Radio Edit. Steve Poltz appeared in the video. In the video Jewel and Poltz appeared together in numerous scenes, most of them depicting how both of them want to be together but always separated. In one scene, Poltz tries to reach for Jewel's hand, but a curtain appears between them separating their hands. In another scene, Jewel lies in front of Poltz and starts to undress and reveals her underwear, but instead of reaching for him, she moves away from him, leaving Poltz with his arms raised towards her. Other scenes include Jewel lying beside a little pond with some little ships (which is also the single's cover), sitting inside a boat in the middle of a room alone, and lastly sitting on the side of a bedroom while Poltz, shirtless, is on the other side and tries to reach for her.

The video won the award for Best Female Video at the 1997 MTV Video Music Awards.

Awards

|-
|rowspan=3| 1997 || rowspan=3|"You Were Meant for Me" || MTV Video Music Award for Best Female Video || 
|-
|MTV Video Music Award – Viewer's Choice || rowspan=2 
|-
|MTV Video Music Award for Video of the Year
|}

Track listings

 US CD single and cassette single
 "You Were Meant for Me" (album edit) – 3:48
 "Foolish Games" (album version) – 5:38

 US CD single re-release
 "You Were Meant for Me" (album edit) – 3:48
 "Foolish Games" (album version) – 5:38
 "Foolish Games" (radio edit) – 4:01
* The "Foolish Games" radio edit is not listed on the inlay of the single

 UK and Australian CD single, UK cassette single
 "You Were Meant for Me" (album edit) – 3:39
 "Cold Song" – 1:03
 "Rocker Girl" – 1:44

Charts

Weekly charts

Year-end charts

Decade-end charts

All-time charts

Certifications

Release history

Cover versions

Bellefire version
A single by the Irish girl group Bellefire was scheduled for release in June 2004, as the follow-up to "Say Something Anyway".  The release was cancelled, although the track received some airplay in some far east countries.  It is included on the album Spin the Wheel.

A promotional video exists and is included on a special edition of the Spin the Wheel album. The video was directed by Andy Hylton.

Other versions
 The song was re-recorded by Hong Kong singer Fiona Sit in April 2005. The album was a success, leading to the release of a second edition, but the song was never promoted as a major single and acted as more of a 'bonus track' of the album.
 On the 2007 American Idols Live! Tour, season six winner Jordin Sparks covered an acoustic version of the song and played it on guitar.
 The song was performed in The Voice (US Season 12) by contestant Lauren Duski in the auditions.  Duski would later win as the runner-up.

References

1995 songs
1996 singles
1997 singles
2004 singles
Atlantic Records singles
Bellefire songs
Jewel (singer) songs
MTV Video Music Award for Best Female Video
Songs written by Jewel (singer)
1990s ballads